Ulrich Hellige is an East German sprint canoer who competed in the mid-1970s. He won a gold medal in the K-4 1000 m event at the 1974 ICF Canoe Sprint World Championships in Mexico City.

References

German male canoeists
Living people
Year of birth missing (living people)
ICF Canoe Sprint World Championships medalists in kayak